Imma niveiciliella is a moth in the family Immidae. It was described by Snellen in 1885. It is found on Sulawesi.

References

Moths described in 1885
Immidae
Moths of Indonesia